Corolla spectabilis, common name: spectacular corolla, is a species of sea butterfly, a floating and swimming sea snail or sea slug, a pelagic marine gastropod mollusk in the family Cymbuliidae.

Distribution
This species is oceanic and has been recorded in European waters, the Gulf of Mexico, and off the coast of Florida, California, Bermuda, Venezuela and Brazil.

Description

References

Further reading
Rosenberg, G., F. Moretzsohn, and E. F. García. 2009. Gastropoda (Mollusca) of the Gulf of Mexico, Pp. 579–699 in Felder, D.L. and D.K. Camp (eds.), Gulf of Mexico–Origins, Waters, and Biota. Biodiversity. Texas A&M Press, College Station, Texas.

External links
video

Cymbuliidae
Gastropods described in 1871